Mimosa texana is a shrub in the family Fabaceae. It is commonly known as the Texas mimosa, the Texas catclaw or the Wherry mimosa and is endemic to upland regions of Mexico and Texas. This species used to be classified as Mimosa biuncifera but it was found that phenotypic variations occurred across its range and a new taxonomy was proposed by Rupert C. Barneby in 1986, splitting the species into Mimosa aculeaticarpa var. biuncifera and Mimosa texana.

Distribution
Texas mimosa is found on alkaline soils in Mexico and Zapata and Starr counties in the state of Texas. It is uncommon and grows on caliche and gravelly hillsides.

Description
This species is a straggly, much branched, deciduous shrub of up to two metres tall. It has slender, zigzag, dark coloured twigs clad in backward pointing prickles. The alternate bi-pinnate leaves have medium-sized leaflets. The globular flowers are creamy-white and cover the bush in the spring. They are intensely fragrant and attract numerous insects. The seed pods are brick red and flattened, with prickly edges.

References

texana